Salma Mumtaz (1926 – 20 January 2012) was a Pakistani film actress, director and producer.

Early life and career
Salma Mumtaz made her film debut as an actress in the 1960 Urdu language film, Neelofar (1960). A dancer in addition to an actor, Mumtaz acted in more than three hundred films, mostly Punjabi language films during her career.

She also became known for portraying mothers and motherly figures opposite well known Pakistani and Indian actors, including Waheed Murad, Mohammad Ali, Shahid and Punjabi language films actor, Akmal. Some of her best known films included Dil Mera Dharkan Teri (1968), Puttar Da Piyar, Heer Ranjha (1970), and Sheran Di Jori. Mumtaz also worked behind the camera as a film director and producer.

Salma Mumtaz was born in Jalandhar, present-day India, in 1926. Mumtaz's brother, Pervaiz Nasir, was a film producer. Mumtaz moved to the city of Lahore, Pakistan, with her family following the British Partition of India in 1947.

Filmography

Death and survivors
Salma Mumtaz died in Lahore on 21 January 2012, from complications of a long battle with diabetes at the age of 85. Her survivors included her daughter, television actress Nida Mumtaz. She was also the elder sister of Pakistani actress, Shammi, of the 1950s fame.

Her colleagues from the Pakistani film industry including actress Bahar Begum and film scriptwriter Pervaiz Kaleem paid tributes to her after her death.

References

External links

 Filmography of Salma Mumtaz on Complete Index To World Film (CITWF) website 

1926 births
2012 deaths
Pakistani film actresses
Pakistani film producers
Pakistani women film directors
Film directors from Lahore
People from Jalandhar
Actresses from Lahore
20th-century Pakistani actresses